The 1987 Prix de l'Arc de Triomphe was a horse race held at Longchamp on Sunday 4 October 1987. It was the 66th running of the Prix de l'Arc de Triomphe.

The winner was Trempolino, a three-year-old colt trained in France by André Fabre. The winning jockey was Pat Eddery.

The winning time of 2m 26.3s set a new record for the race. The previous record of 2m 27.7s was achieved by Dancing Brave in 1986.

Race details
 Sponsor: Trusthouse Forte
 Purse: 6,800,000 F; First prize: 4,000,000 F
 Going: Good to Firm
 Distance: 2,400 metres
 Number of runners: 11
 Winner's time: 2m 26.3s (new record)

Full result

 Abbreviations: nse = nose; hd = head

Winner's details
Further details of the winner, Trempolino.
 Sex: Colt
 Foaled: 17 March 1984
 Country: United States
 Sire: Sharpen Up; Dam: Trephine (Viceregal)
 Owner: Paul de Moussac
 Breeder: Marystead Farm

References

Prix de l'Arc de Triomphe
 1987
1987 in Paris
October 1987 sports events in Europe